Bolma tantalea is a species of sea snail, a marine gastropod mollusk in the family Turbinidae, the turban snails.

Distribution
This marine species occurs in the Pacific Ocean off Tahiti at depths between 390 m and 790 m.

References

External links
 To Encyclopedia of Life
 To World Register of Marine Species
 MNHN : Bolma tantalea

tantalea
Gastropods described in 2010